Richard Belmont Ray (February 2, 1927 – May 29, 1999) was an American politician who served as a member of the United States House of Representatives for Georgia's 3rd congressional district from 1983 to 1993.

Early life 
Ray was born in Fort Valley, Georgia, and graduated from Crawford County High School in Roberta, Georgia, in 1944.

Career 
After graduating from high school, Ray served in the United States Navy during World War II, from 1944 to 1946. After the war, Ray worked as a farmer and local businessman before serving as mayor of Perry, Georgia, from 1964 to 1970. During that time, Sam Nunn was city attorney, and after Nunn's election to the United States Senate in 1972, Ray became Nunn's administrative assistant.

In 1982, Ray was elected as a Democrat to the United States House of Representatives representing Georgia's 3rd congressional district. He was re-elected to that position four times.

After the 1990 Census, Georgia gained a new congressional district. Despite this, the Democratic-controlled Georgia General Assembly dismantled Georgia's 6th congressional district and shifted much of the southern portion of Newt Gingrich's old territory into Ray's Columbus-based district. However, the new district was considerably more urban and Republican than Ray's old district. Ray lost to Republican state Senator Mac Collins, a resident of the former Gingrich territory, by almost 10 points.

Personal life 
After his congressional service, Ray resided in both Byron, Georgia and Alexandria, Virginia. He died in Macon, Georgia in 1999.

References

External links
 
 Retrieved on 2008-01-26

 

1927 births
1999 deaths
People from Fort Valley, Georgia
United States Navy sailors
United States Navy personnel of World War II
Democratic Party members of the United States House of Representatives from Georgia (U.S. state)
Mayors of places in Georgia (U.S. state)
People from Crawford County, Georgia
20th-century American politicians